Grevillea fasciculata is a species of flowering plant in the family Proteaceae and is endemic to the south-west of Western Australia. It is a low, often spreading shrub with narrowly elliptic to more or less linear leaves and erect clusters of red and orange or orange and yellow flowers.

Description
The edges of the leaves are turned down or rolled under, the upper surface of the leaves more or less smooth, the lower surface silky- or woolly-hairy or obscured.

Taxonomy
Grevillea fasciculata was first formally described in 1830 by Robert Brown in the Supplementum primum prodromi florae Novae Hollandiae from specimens collected by William Baxter near King George Sound in 1829. The specific epithet (fasciculata) means "clustered", referring to the flowers.

Distribution and habitat
This grevillea grows in woodland, mallee shrubland and scrub, mainly between Bremer Bay, Borden, Cranbrook and Albany in the Avon Wheatbelt, Esperance Plains and Jarrah Forest biogeographic regions of south-western Western Australia.

Conservation status
Grevillea exposita is listed as "not threatened" by the Government of Western Australia Department of Biodiversity, Conservation and Attractions.

References

fasciculata
Endemic flora of Western Australia
Eudicots of Western Australia
Proteales of Australia
Taxa named by Robert Brown (botanist, born 1773)
Plants described in 1830